Blue Ridge Farm is a historic home and farm located near Upperville, Fauquier County, Virginia.

Overview
The property includes a two-story, rubble stone Federal era farmhouse known as Fountain Hill House (c. 1791) and its associated outbuildings and two contributing sites; a one-story Colonial Revival-style stone house known as Blue Ridge Farmhouse (1935) and its associated outbuildings, and formal landscape features around it; two tenant houses (Crawford House and Byington House, c. 1903); and several buildings associated with the farm's horse breeding industry, including three large broodmare stables (c. 1903); two stallion stables (stud barns, c. 1913); training stables, and an implement shed.

The Blue Ridge Farmhouse was designed in 1933-1934 by Washington, D.C. architect Waddy B. Wood. Californian Henry T. Oxnard (1860-1922) built a horse breeding operation at Blue Ridge Farm in 1903.

Purchased by Rear Admiral Cary Travers Grayson in 1928, members of the Grayson family still own the property.

It was listed on the National Register of Historic Places in 2006.

References

Houses on the National Register of Historic Places in Virginia
Farms on the National Register of Historic Places in Virginia
Federal architecture in Virginia
Colonial Revival architecture in Virginia
Houses completed in 1791
Houses in Fauquier County, Virginia
National Register of Historic Places in Fauquier County, Virginia